Bursa Technical University is a public research university in Bursa, Turkey. Bursa Technical University Rector is Professor Doctor Naci Çağlar. Established in 2010, it is country's fifth technical university. The university consists of six faculties, two institutes and a school. It started education in the 2011-12 semester. Bursa Technical University entered the top 50 in Turkey according to the results of the 'Entrepreneur and Innovative University Index 2021', which was created under the leadership of TUBITAK and announced to the public every year.

Number of students and academic staff 
In the 2019-2020 academic year, 4,807 undergraduate and 1,213 graduate students study at the university.

As of 2020, the university has 33 professors, 38 associate professors, 116 doctors, 223 teaching and research assistants, as well as 154 administrative and 100 service staff.

Academic units

Faculties 
Nature Sciences, Architecture and Engineering
Mechanical engineering
Mathematics
Chemistry
Chemical engineering
Food engineering
Civil engineering
Metallurgy and Materials engineering
Architecture
Electrical and Electronics engineering
Energy systems engineering
Environmental science
Bioengineering
Industrial engineering
Mechatronics Engineering
Human and Social Sciences
International relations
International trade and Logistics
Psychology
Maritime
Forestry
Bursa Technical University, Faculty of Forestry, was founded with the university’s other 5 Faculties, 2 Institutes and 1 College by the decision of the Council of Ministers which was published in the Official Gazette dated 21/07/2010 and numbered 27648. There are Forest Engineering and Forest Industry Engineering departments in the faculty. Faculty of Forestry has not yet accepted any graduate students. After the infrastructure projects are completed, the students in the Forest Engineering Department will graduate with the title of Forest Engineer and the ones in the Forest Industry Engineering Department with the title of Forest Industry Engineer. The master program in the Department of Forest Industry Engineering, in the Faculty of Forestry has been opened and graduate students have been accepted since the Spring semester of 2012-2013. Plus, Interdisciplinary Forest Products Master Program which is 30% and 100% mainly English started to accept students in the Fall semester of 2013-2014. Faculty members and administrative staff have been maintaining their services in the building allocated to them within Merinos Atatürk Congress and Culture Center.
Communications
Arts and Design

Institutes
Science
Social Science

Schools
Foreign languages

References

External links 
 

Education in Bursa
State universities and colleges in Turkey
Educational institutions established in 2010
2010 establishments in Turkey